Jim Vollenweider was a player in the National Football League for the San Francisco 49ers in 1962 and 1963 as a halfback. He played at the collegiate level at the University of Miami. Vollenweider was drafted in the eighth round of the 1962 NFL Draft by the 49ers. He was also drafted in the eighteenth round of the 1962 American Football League Draft by the Oakland Raiders.

Biography
Vollenweider was born on September 2, 1939. He attended high school in Schofield, Wisconsin. Vollenweider died June 1, 1998 in Ewa Beach, Hawaii.

References

1939 births
1998 deaths
Miami Hurricanes football players
San Francisco 49ers players
Players of American football from Wisconsin
People from Schofield, Wisconsin
American football halfbacks